Carlow County  was a parliamentary constituency in Ireland, which from 1801 to 1885 returned two Members of Parliament (MPs) to the House of Commons of Great Britain and Ireland, and one MP from 1885 to 1922.

Boundaries and boundary changes
This constituency comprised the whole of County Carlow, except for Carlow Borough, which was separately represented from 1801 to 1885.

It returned two MPs 1801–1885, but only one from 1885 to 1922. This was the only Irish county not divided for Parliamentary purposes in the redistribution of 1885. It was thus the only Irish county constituency to exist at every general election from the union with Great Britain to the partition of Ireland.

The constituency ceased to be entitled to be represented in the UK House of Commons on the dissolution of 26 October 1922, shortly before the Irish Free State came into existence on 6 December 1922.

Politics
In the 1918 election the Sinn Féin candidate was unopposed.

Dáil Éireann 1918–1922
The constituency was, in Irish republican theory, entitled to return one Teachta Dála (known in English as a Deputy) in 1918 to serve in the Irish Republic's First Dáil. Sinn Féin used the UK general election in 1918 to elect the Dáil. The revolutionary body assembled on 21 January 1919. The list of members read out on that day included everyone elected in Ireland. Only the Sinn Féin Deputies participated in the Dáil, but the other Irish MPs could have done so if they had chosen to adhere to the Republic.

The First Dáil, passed a motion at its last meeting on 10 May 1921, the first three parts of which make explicit the republican view.
 1. That the Parliamentary elections which are to take place during the present month be regarded as elections to Dáil Éireann.
 2. That all deputies duly returned at these elections be regarded as members of Dáil Éireann and allowed to take their seats on subscribing to the proposed Oath of Allegiance.
 3. That the present Dáil dissolve automatically as soon as the new body has been summoned by the President and called to order.

The Second Dáil first met on 16 August 1921, thereby dissolving the First Dáil.

Sinn Féin had decided to use the polls for the Northern Ireland House of Commons and the House of Commons of Southern Ireland as an election for the Irish Republic's Second Dáil. No actual voting was necessary in Southern Ireland as all the seats were filled by unopposed returns. Except for Dublin University all other constituencies elected Sinn Féin TDs. As with the First Dáil, the other deputies could have joined the Dáil if they chose.

From the Third Dáil onwards the Dáil represented only the twenty-six counties which formed the Irish Free State.

In the 2nd and 3rd Dála, Carlow formed part of the Carlow–Kilkenny constituency.

Members of Parliament

MPs 1801–1885 

Notes:-
 a Vigors was a supporter of the Whig/Repealer pact, 1835–1841, who in 1832–1835 had been MP for the borough of Carlow Borough as a member of the Repeal Association.

MPs 1885–1922

Elections

Elections in the 1830s

 
 

 
 

 
 
 

 
 

 

On petition, Bruen and Kavanagh were unseated and a by-election was called.

 
 
 

After a further petition, the poll was amended and 105 votes for Vigors and Raphael were struck off. Kavanagh and Bruen were declared elected.

Kavanagh's death caused a by-election.

Elections in the 1840s
Vigors' death caused a by-election.

 
 

 
 

  

Bunbury's death caused a by-election.

Elections in the 1850s

 
 
 

Bruen's death caused a by-election.

Elections in the 1860s
McClintock Bunbury resigned, causing a by-election.

Elections in the 1870s

Elections in the 1880s

 

 

 Gray elects to sit for Dublin St Stephen's Green

 Death of Blake

Elections in the 1890s

 Death of the O’Gorman Mahon

Elections in the 1900s

Hammond's death causes a by-election.

Elections in the 1910s

See also 
 List of United Kingdom Parliament constituencies in Ireland and Northern Ireland
 Historic Dáil constituencies
 Dáil Éireann (Irish Republic)
 Members of the 1st Dáil

References 

The Parliaments of England by Henry Stooks Smith (1st edition published in three volumes 1844–50), 2nd edition edited (in one volume) by F.W.S. Craig (Political Reference Publications 1973)

External links
 Oireachtas Members Database

Westminster constituencies in County Carlow (historic)
Carlow
Constituencies of the Parliament of the United Kingdom established in 1801
Constituencies of the Parliament of the United Kingdom disestablished in 1922